Siničane is a village in the municipality of Bogovinje, North Macedonia.

History
According to the 1467-68 Ottoman defter, Siničane appears as being largely inhabited by an Orthodox Christian Albanian population. Some families had a mixed Slav-Albanian anthroponomy - usually a Slavic first name and an Albanian last name or last names with Albanian patronyms and Slavic suffixes.

The names are: Nikolla, son of Gjon; Gjon, son of Klajo-o; Gjon star (old man); Don-ko, his son; Nik-o, of Andre-ja; Ivan, son of Andre-ja-; Todor, his brother; Pal-lesh Todor, son of Zero-Ziro; Radoslav, son of Gjon; Nikola, son of Gjesh; Mihal, son of Dujak.

Demographics
As of the 2021 census, Siničane had 1,205 residents with the following ethnic composition:
Albanians 1,155
Persons for whom data are taken from administrative sources 50

According to the 2002 census, the village had a total of 1472 inhabitants. Ethnic groups in the village include:

Albanians 1469
Others 3

References

External links

Villages in Bogovinje Municipality
Albanian communities in North Macedonia